Trabzonspor U21 is a youth football team from Trabzonspor. The club competes in the U21 Ligi, against other U21 clubs in Turkey. An U21 team is made up of players between the ages of 18 and 20, and it is the last level of amateur play before a footballer reaches professional status in Turkey. The club was founded by former Trabzonspor footballer and manager Özkan Sümer in 1972. They were the first youth team in Turkey, and became an official branch of Trabzonspor in 1975. The club has won two league titles in 1996–97 and 2003–04.

Honours 

U21 Ligi
Winners (3): 1991–92, 1996–97, 2003–04

Current squad 
As of 9 June 2010.

Former players 
Trabzonspor has a notable youth academy, producing several Turkey national football team players including Hami Mandıralı, Gökdeniz Karadeniz, Fatih Tekke, Hüseyin Çimşir, Mehmet Yılmaz, Tolga Zengin, and Metin Aktaş. Gökdeniz Karadeniz is the most-capped Turkish international to come through the Trabzonspor academy.

References 

A2 Ligi clubs
A2
1972 establishments in Turkey